David Ward-Steinman (November 6, 1936 – April 14, 2015) was an American composer and professor. He was the author of Toward a Comparative Structural Theory of the Arts, and co-authored Comparative Anthology of Musical Forms.

Ward-Steinman spent his remaining days dividing his time between San Diego State University and Indiana University in Bloomington. He was formerly Composer-in-Residence and Professor of Music at San Diego State, and then became Distinguished Professor of Music Emeritus there, and also an Adjunct Professor of Music at Indiana, where he taught in the spring.

Biography
Ward-Steinman studied at Florida State University and the University of Illinois, where he received the Kinley Memorial Fellowship for foreign study. After receiving his doctorate, he was a fellow at Princeton University from 1970. His teachers included John Boda, Burrill Phillips, Darius Milhaud (at Aspen, Colorado), Milton Babbitt (at Tanglewood) and Nadia Boulanger. He studied piano under Edward Kilenyi, and in 1995 attended a course at IRCAM.

From 1970 to 1972, Ward-Steinman was the Ford Foundation composer-in-residence for the Tampa Bay area of Florida and he spent 1989–90 in Australia under a Fulbright Senior Scholar Award, with residencies at the Victorian Centre for the Arts and La Trobe University in Melbourne.

Ward-Steinman has received number of commissions, most notably from the Chicago Symphony Orchestra. His orchestral works have been performed by a number of ensembles, including the Japan Philharmonic Orchestra, New Orleans Philharmonic Orchestra, San Diego Symphony Orchestra, and the Seattle Symphony Orchestra. His music has been recorded on a number of labels, including Harmonia Mundi.

References

Citations

Sources
 Tritone-Tenuto biography
 SigmaAlphaIota biography
 Theodore Presser Co. (publishers) website, David Ward-Steinman
 Oxford Music Online, Marshall Bialosky, Ward-Steinman, David

Further reading

External links
David Ward-Steinman's page at Theodore Presser Company
Personal site
Alternate

1936 births
2015 deaths
American people of German descent
20th-century classical composers
American male classical composers
American classical composers
Florida State University alumni
Pupils of Darius Milhaud
21st-century classical composers
21st-century American composers
University of Illinois alumni
San Diego State University faculty
Indiana University faculty
Princeton University fellows
Experimental Music Studios alumni
20th-century American composers